Trevor Tyler (born 29 September 1952) is a former Australian rules footballer who played with Essendon in the Victorian Football League (VFL). He later played for Bayswater and Boronia.

Notes

External links 		
		

Essendon Football Club past player profile
		
		
		

Living people
1952 births
Australian rules footballers from Victoria (Australia)		
Essendon Football Club players
Rupanyup Football Club players